Xu Linyin (Simplified Chinese:, born 20 March 1986 in Shanghai) is a Chinese professional beach volleyball player.

Career 

Nicknamed "Giant" because of his height, Xu Linyin stands 6 feet 7 inches tall. He headed into the 2008 Olympics as the #1 seed with his teammate Penggen Wu. They placed 5th in the FIVB Beach Volleyball Olympic Ranking, but were #1 seed because of FIVB regulations. Unfortunately they lost to the German pair of David Klemperer and Eric Koreng in the last 16.

On 14 June 2010, Xu Linyin and partner Wu Penggen bested the Olympic Champions from USA Todd Rogers and Phil Dalhausser 21–17, 17-21 and 17–15 to win the Gold at the FIVB World Tour in Moscow. This was the first time China won the title in the men's event in the 24-year history of the international Beach Volleyball circuit.

The duo of Xu and Wu continued their extraordinary performance with a second Gold on the FIVB World Tour in Marseille, France on 25 July 2010, and ended the season ranked 4th overall on the FIVB Beach Volleyball World Rankings.

At the 2012 Olympics, he and Wu did not qualify out of the pool stages.

See also
China at the 2012 Summer Olympics#Volleyball
Beach volleyball at the 2012 Summer Olympics – Men's tournament

References

External links
 
 
 
 

1986 births
Living people
Chinese men's volleyball players
Chinese beach volleyball players
Olympic beach volleyball players of China
Asian Games medalists in beach volleyball
Asian Games gold medalists for China
Asian Games silver medalists for China
Beach volleyball players at the 2006 Asian Games
Beach volleyball players at the 2008 Summer Olympics
Beach volleyball players at the 2010 Asian Games
Beach volleyball players at the 2012 Summer Olympics
Volleyball players from Shanghai
Medalists at the 2006 Asian Games
Medalists at the 2010 Asian Games
21st-century Chinese people